In differential geometry, a subject of mathematics, a symplectic manifold is a smooth manifold, equipped with a closed nondegenerate differential 2-form , called the symplectic form. The study of symplectic manifolds is called symplectic geometry or symplectic topology. Symplectic manifolds arise naturally in abstract formulations of classical mechanics and analytical mechanics as the cotangent bundles of manifolds. For example, in the Hamiltonian formulation of classical mechanics, which provides one of the major motivations for the field, the set of all possible configurations of a system is modeled as a manifold, and this manifold's cotangent bundle describes the phase space of the system.

Motivation 
Symplectic manifolds arise from classical mechanics; in particular, they are a generalization of the phase space of a closed system. Since one desires the Hamiltonian to be constant along flow lines, one should have , which implies that ω is alternating and hence a 2-form. Finally, one makes the requirement that ω should not change under flow lines, i.e. that the Lie derivative of ω along VH vanishes. Applying Cartan's formula, this amounts to (here  is the interior product): 

so that, on repeating this argument for different smooth functions  such that the corresponding  span the tangent space at each point the argument is applied at, we see that the requirement for the vanishing Lie derivative along flows of  corresponding to arbitrary smooth  is equivalent to the requirement that ω should be closed.

Definition 
A symplectic form on a smooth manifold  is a closed non-degenerate differential 2-form . That is to say, if there exists an  such that  for all , then . Since in odd dimensions, skew-symmetric matrices are always singular, the requirement that  be nondegenerate implies that  has an even dimension. The closed condition means that the exterior derivative of  vanishes.

Examples

Symplectic vector spaces 

Let  be a basis for  We define our symplectic form ω on this basis as follows:

In this case the symplectic form reduces to a simple quadratic form. If In denotes the n × n identity matrix then the matrix, Ω, of this quadratic form is given by the  block matrix:

Cotangent bundles 
Let  be a smooth manifold of dimension . Then the total space of the cotangent bundle  has a natural symplectic form, called the Poincaré two-form or the canonical symplectic form

Cotangent bundles are the natural phase spaces of classical mechanics. The point of distinguishing upper and lower indexes is driven by the case of the manifold having a metric tensor, as is the case for Riemannian manifolds. Upper and lower indexes transform contra and covariantly under a change of coordinate frames. The phrase "fibrewise coordinates with respect to the cotangent vectors" is meant to convey that the momenta  are "soldered" to the velocities . The soldering is an expression of the idea that velocity and momentum are colinear, in that both move in the same direction, and differ by a scale factor.

Kähler manifolds 
A Kähler manifold is a symplectic manifold equipped with a compatible integrable complex structure. They form a particular class of complex manifolds. A large class of examples come from complex algebraic geometry. Any smooth complex projective variety  has a symplectic form which is the restriction of the Fubini—Study form on the projective space .

Almost-complex manifolds 
Riemannian manifolds with an -compatible almost complex structure are termed almost-complex manifolds. They generalize Kähler manifolds, in that they need not be integrable.  That is, they do not necessarily arise from a complex structure on the manifold.

Lagrangian and other submanifolds 
There are several natural geometric notions of submanifold of a symplectic manifold :

 Isotropic submanifolds are submanifolds where the symplectic form restricts to zero, i.e. each tangent space is an isotropic subspace of the ambient manifold's tangent space. Similarly, if each tangent subspace to a submanifold is co-isotropic (the dual of an isotropic subspace), the submanifold is called co-isotropic.
Lagrangian submanifolds are the maximal isotropic submanifolds.  

One major example is that the graph of a symplectomorphism in the product symplectic manifold  is Lagrangian. Their intersections display rigidity properties not possessed by smooth manifolds; the Arnold conjecture gives the sum of the submanifold's Betti numbers as a lower bound for the number of self intersections of a smooth Lagrangian submanifold, rather than the Euler characteristic in the smooth case.

Examples 
Let  have global coordinates labelled . Then, we can equip  with the canonical symplectic form 

 

The form  vanishes on  because given any pair of tangent vectors  we have that  To elucidate, consider the case . Notice that when we expand this out

both terms we have a  factor, which is 0, by definition.

Example: Cotangent bundle
The cotangent bundle of a manifold is locally modeled on a space similar to the first example. It can be shown that we can glue these affine symplectic forms hence this bundle forms a symplectic manifold. A less trivial example of a Lagrangian submanifold is the zero section of the cotangent bundle of a manifold. For example, let 

Then, we can present  as

This example can be repeated for any manifold defined by the vanishing locus of smooth functions  and their differentials .

Example: Parametric submanifold 
Consider the canonical space  with coordinates .

This manifold is a Lagrangian submanifold if the Lagrange bracket  vanishes for all . That is, it is Lagrangian if 

  

for all .  This can be seen by expanding

in the condition for a Lagrangian submanifold . This is that the symplectic form must vanish on the tangent manifold ; that is, it must vanish for all tangent vectors:

for all . Simplify the result by making use of the canonical symplectic form on :

and all others vanishing.

As local charts on a symplectic manifold take on the canonical form, this example suggests that Lagrangian submanifolds are relatively unconstrained. The classification of symplectic manifolds is done via Floer homology—this is an application of Morse theory to the action functional for maps between Lagrangian submanifolds. In physics, the action describes the  time evolution of a physical system; here, it can be taken as the description of the dynamics of branes.

Example: Morse theory
Another useful class of Lagrangian submanifolds occur in Morse theory. Given a Morse function  and for a small enough  one can construct a Lagrangian submanifold given by the vanishing locus .

Special Lagrangian submanifolds 
The following examples are known as special Lagrangian submanifolds,
 complex Lagrangian submanifolds of hyperKahler manifolds,
 fixed points of a real structure of Calabi–Yau manifolds.
The SYZ conjecture deals with the study of special Lagrangian submanifolds in mirror symmetry; see . 

The Thomas–Yau conjecture predicts that the existence of a special Lagrangian submanifolds on Calabi–Yau manifolds in Hamiltonian isotopy classes of Lagrangians is equivalent to stability with respect to a stability condition on the Fukaya category of the manifold.

Lagrangian fibration 
A Lagrangian fibration of a symplectic manifold M is a fibration where all of the fibres are Lagrangian submanifolds. This form is called the Poincaré two-form or the canonical two-form. Using this set-up we can locally think of M as being the cotangent bundle  and the Lagrangian fibration as the trivial fibration  This is the canonical picture.

Lagrangian mapping 

Let L be a Lagrangian submanifold of a symplectic manifold (K,ω) given by an immersion  (i is called a Lagrangian immersion). Let  give a Lagrangian fibration of K. The composite  is a Lagrangian mapping. The critical value set of π ∘ i is called a caustic.

Symbolically:
 
where τ∗ω2 denotes the pull back of ω2 by τ.

Special cases and generalizations 
 A symplectic manifold  is exact if the symplectic form  is exact. For example, the cotangent bundle of a smooth manifold is an exact symplectic manifold. The canonical symplectic form is exact.
 A symplectic manifold endowed with a metric that is compatible with the symplectic form is an almost Kähler manifold in the sense that the tangent bundle has an almost complex structure, but this need not be integrable.
 Symplectic manifolds are special cases of a Poisson manifold.
 A multisymplectic manifold of degree k is a manifold equipped with a closed nondegenerate k-form.
 A polysymplectic manifold is a Legendre bundle provided with a polysymplectic tangent-valued -form; it is utilized in Hamiltonian field theory.

See also 

 
 —an odd-dimensional counterpart of the symplectic manifold.

Citations

General and cited references

Further reading  
 
 
 
 
 
 

Differential topology
Hamiltonian mechanics
Smooth manifolds
Symplectic geometry